Uropterygius polystictus is a moray eel found in coral reefs around Mexico and the Galapagos Islands. It is commonly known as the many-spotted moray, or the peppered moray.

References

polystictus
Fish described in 1941